June Tyson (February 5, 1936 – November 24, 1992) was an American singer, violinist, and dancer who performed with bandleader Sun Ra.

Biography
A native of Albemarle, North Carolina, Tyson worked in Harlem during the 1960s as a singer. She met pianist Sun Ra and became the only woman in his band, the Arkestra. Tyson also worked as the band's costume designer, choreographer, and violinist. She married a member of the crew who designed lighting and sound. Their home in Harlem became a regular stop for members of the band.

References

1936 births
1992 deaths
People from Albemarle, North Carolina
American jazz singers
American women jazz singers
American jazz violinists
Sun Ra Arkestra members
20th-century American violinists
20th-century American singers
20th-century American women singers
Jazz musicians from North Carolina